Liliane de Kermadec (6 October 1928 – 13 February 2020) was a Polish-French film director and screenwriter. She directed more than twenty films and documentaries between 1965 and 2016.

Career
Liliane de Kermadec began as a set photographer, working with Agnes Varda on Cléo from 5 to 7, Alain Resnais on Muriel, and Yves Robert on Berbert and the Train.

Liliane de Kermadec's first two feature films, Home Sweet Home (1972) and Aloïse (1975), were both screened at Cannes Film Festival.

Filmography 
 Le Murmure des ruines (2008)
 La Très chère indépendance du Haut Karabagh (2005)
 La Piste du télégraphe (1994)
 Un moment d'inattention (1986)
 Mersonne ne m'aime (1982)
 Le Petit Pommier (1981)
 Aloïse (1975)
 Home Sweet Home (1972)
 Qui donc a rêvé? (1965)
 Le Temps d'Emma (1964)

References

External links 

French film directors
1928 births
2020 deaths
French women film directors
French women screenwriters
French screenwriters